Inokuma (written: 猪熊) is a Japanese surname. Notable people with the surname include:

Genichiro Inokuma (1902–1993), Japanese painter
, Japanese judoka
Yukio Inokuma (born 1920), Japanese sport shooter

Japanese-language surnames